Kim Hee-jung (born April 16, 1992) is a South Korean actress. She made her acting debut in 2000 as a child actress, playing the titular character in Kkokji (also known as Tough Guy's Love). As Kim reached her early twenties, one of her notable roles was Gwanghae's queen consort in the 2014 period drama The King's Face. In May 2016, Kim signed with YG Entertainment. In August 2019, she left YG Entertainment and signed with Sublime Artist Agency. She is also a member of the South Korean female dance crew Purplow, known by the stage name Bibi.

Filmography

Film

Television series

Variety show

Music video

Discography

References

External links
 
 
 
  
 
 Kim Hee-jung at Daum 

1992 births
Living people
South Korean television actresses
South Korean film actresses
South Korean child actresses
South Korean web series actresses
Chung-Ang University alumni
Actresses from Busan
21st-century South Korean actresses